João Felipe Schmidt Urbano (born 19 May 1993), known as João Schmidt, is a Brazilian professional footballer who plays as a defensive midfielder for Kawasaki Frontale.

Club career

São Paulo
Schmidt began his career with hometown club São Paulo in 2005.

Loan to Vitória de Setúbal
In July 2014, he made his first move abroad, joining Primeira Liga club, Vitória de Setúbal.

Atalanta
In July 2017, Schmidt left São Paulo for Italian side Atalanta.

Rio Ave loan
On 6 July 2018, Schmidt joined Rio Ave on a one-year loan deal with an option to make the move permanent. On 2 February 2019, Rio Ave and Atalanta agreed to end the loan deal early.

Nagoya Grampus
On 6 February 2019, Nagoya Grampus announced the signing of Schmidt.

Kawasaki Frontale
Schmidt joined reigning J1 League champions Kawasaki Frontale in 2021.

Honours
São Paulo
Copa Sudamericana: 2012

Brazil U20
Toulon Tournament: 2013

Kawasaki Frontale
J1 League: 2021
Japanese Super Cup: 2021

References

External links
 

Living people
1993 births
Brazilian footballers
Brazilian people of German descent
Association football midfielders
Campeonato Brasileiro Série A players
Primeira Liga players
J1 League players
São Paulo FC players
Vitória F.C. players
Atalanta B.C. players
Rio Ave F.C. players
Nagoya Grampus players
Kawasaki Frontale players
Brazilian expatriate footballers
Expatriate footballers in Portugal
Expatriate footballers in Italy
Footballers from São Paulo